Sara Kristina Widén (9 May 1981 – 13 June 2014) was a Swedish opera singer (soprano). From 2013 until her death, she was starring in productions by the Royal Swedish Opera.

Widén was born in Halmstad, Halland County. Her younger brother, Jacob (born 1983), is a member of the punk rock band Neverstore.

Death
Widén died from cancer on 13 June 2014 in Stockholm, aged 33.

References

External links

 
 

1981 births
2014 deaths
Deaths from cancer in Sweden
Swedish operatic sopranos
Singers from Halmstad